Pogrodzie  is a village in the administrative district of Gmina Tolkmicko, within Elbląg County, Warmian-Masurian Voivodeship, in northern Poland.

The village has a population of 660.

References

Pogrodzie